Seethakoka Chiluka  is a 2006 Indian Telugu-language film directed by A. R. Rajaraja. Navdeep and Sheela Kaur play the lead roles. Adolescent dreams and desires form its theme. The film was dubbed in Tamil as Ilavattam with a few reshot scenes.

Plot
The movie begins in college, with the district collector awarding Srinivas alias Cheenu and asking him to share his success story with everybody. Cheenu is an honest and studious village guy who hails from a poor farmer's family. Despite his friends' attempts to sway him towards the lusty distractions of adolescence, he stands his ground and tries to persuade them to follow his path. Lakshmi is the second daughter of a Zamindar also from the same village who studies at the same college as Cheenu. Despite their hatred for each other at the beginning, they end up falling for each other after a lot of melodrama. Lakshmi's brother-in-law (her elder sister's husband) lusts for her and tries to inherit their fortune by marrying both the Zamindar's daughters. He tries to beat Cheenu to death when everybody finds about their love affair. In an attempt to escape Prithviraj, the couple seeks protection from the district collector, who assures them that she would help them marry each other after they finish their education. The movie ends with a tedious action episode between Cheenu and Prithviraj and the title rolls.

Cast
 Navdeep as Srinivas
 Sheela as Lakshmi
 Vijayakumar as Lakshmi's father
 Suhasini as District Collector
 Ali
 Sangeetha
 Manorama
 Subhalekha Sudhakar
 Babloo Prithiveeraj
 Dharmavarapu Subramanyam
 Surekha Vani
 Krishna Bhagawan as Professor 
 Nalla Venu
 Prudhvi Raj

Tamil version
 M. S. Bhaskar as Teacher
 Manobala
 Kadhal Sukumar

Soundtrack

References

External links
 

2006 films
Indian romantic comedy films
2000s Telugu-language films
2006 romantic comedy films
Films scored by Mani Sharma